Jean-Pierre Bourgeot (born 25 November 1968 in Moulins, Allier) is a French former cyclist. He participated in four editions of the Tour de France and one Vuelta a España.

Major results

1991
1st Stage 1 Tour de Gironde
1992
 1st Grand Prix Cristal Energie
 2nd Circuit de Lorraine
 8th Overall Peace Race
1993
 4th Overall Circuit Cycliste Sarthe
1997
 1st Road race, Auvergne Road Championships

References

Sportspeople from Moulins, Allier
1968 births
Living people
French male cyclists
Cyclists from Auvergne-Rhône-Alpes